Song of the Sea is a 2014 animated fantasy film directed and co-produced by Tomm Moore, co-produced by Ross Murray, Paul Young, Stephen Roelants, Serge and Marc Ume, Isabelle Truc, Clement Calvet, Jeremie Fajner, Frederik Villumsen, and Claus Toksvig Kjaer, and written by Will Collins from Moore's story. An international co-production between the Republic of Ireland, Belgium, Denmark, France and Luxembourg, it is the second feature film by Cartoon Saloon. The film is the second installment in Moore's "Irish Folklore Trilogy", following his previous film The Secret of Kells (2009) and preceding the film Wolfwalkers (2020). It is also the only one to be set in contemporary times, as the previously mentioned two movies take place during the Middle Ages and the 17th century respectively.

Song of the Sea follows the story of a 10-year-old Irish boy named Ben (David Rawle) who discovers that his mute sister Saoirse, whom he blames for the apparent death of his mother, is a selkie who has to free faerie creatures from the Celtic goddess Macha.

Like other Saloon films, the film was hand-drawn. The film began production soon after the release of The Secret of Kells, premiered at the 2014 Toronto International Film Festival on 6 September in the "TIFF Kids" programme. The film had a limited release in certain countries, but received critical acclaim and won the Satellite Award for Best Animated or Mixed Media Feature and European Film Award for Best Animated Feature Film, as well as the nominations for Best Animated Feature at the 87th Academy Awards and 42nd Annie Awards.

The Irish-language version has been produced by Macalla with funding from TG4 and the Broadcasting Authority of Ireland, with selected cinemas in Ireland screening it from 10 July 2015. Brendan Gleeson and Fionnula Flanagan reprised their respective roles in this version. The DVD with the Irish audio can be bought in Cartoon Saloon's online store.

Plot

Conor, a lighthouse keeper, lives on an island with his son Ben, his pregnant wife Bronagh, and their Old English Sheepdog Cú at the coast of Ireland. Bronagh disappears late one night, presumably dying after giving birth to a daughter named Saoirse.

Six years later, Conor is broken, Saoirse is mute, and Ben is hostile toward Saoirse, blaming her for Bronagh's disappearance. On Saoirse's birthday, they are visited by their grandmother, who regards the lighthouse as an unfit place to raise the children. That night, Ben scares Saoirse with a story of Mac Lir and his mother Macha, the Owl Witch, who stole his feelings and turned him to stone. Later, Saoirse plays a seashell horn given to Ben by their mother, leading her to a white sealskin coat in Conor's closet. She puts on the coat and walks to a group of seals in the sea, revealing herself as a selkie. After swimming, she is found by Granny on the seashore, who insists upon taking the children to her home on the Mainland. Conor reluctantly agrees despite Ben's protests, locks the coat in a chest, and throws it into the sea.

On Halloween, Saoirse plays Ben's seashell, alerting the Faeries called "Na Daoine Sídhe" to her. She and Ben attempt to go home, but encounter the Faeries, who hope she will allow them to return to the Tír na nÓg. However, they are attacked by Macha's owls, turning the Faeries to stone. The siblings flee the spot and take a country bus, and run into Cú, who had followed them. However, Saoirse is growing ill, due to not having her seal coat and being away from the ocean. They come across a holy well, which Saoirse dives into. Ben follows her and meets the Great Seanachaí: they learn Saoirse was kidnapped by Macha, and she is mute because she needs the coat and will soon die if she does not get it back. He gives Ben one of his hairs that will lead him to Macha. As he follows the hair, it shows him that Bronagh – a selkie herself – was forced to return to the ocean on the night of Saoirse's birth, leaving her husband and children behind. Since Ben found the truth, the walls of hair open, showing him a way out and to the house. The Faeries who turned to stone speak out to warn Ben to avoid the jars, tell him to be careful and brave, and wish him good luck.

Ben then meets Macha, who explains that when Mac Lir suffered from a broken heart, she turned him into an island near their home. She is determined to do likewise for everyone, even herself, to spare them pain. Ben manages to rescue Saoirse, giving Macha back her feelings and allowing her to recognize that taking away feelings doesn't help. She helps to fly them back home along with two Faerie dogs, and Conor attempts to take Saoirse to a hospital. Ben dives into the sea in search of Saoirse's coat and recovers it with the seals’ help. After Conor brings him on the boat, Saoirse's coat is put on her, and her voice surprises Ben and Conor. Saoirse's coat changes her into a little seal. Ben rides on her back and his father rides on another seal's back to Mac Lir's island. The group is then washed up on Mac Lir's island, but Saoirse's health is not fully restored. Ben tries to get Saoirse to sing, and she eventually sings the Song of the Sea. The song causes Saoirse's health to be fully restored, along with the faeries and spirits whom Macha had turned to stone, and opens the way to Tír na nÓg.

Bronagh appears to take Saoirse to Tír na nÓg with her, but Ben and Conor plead to let Saoirse stay with them, because she's all they have. Since she is half-human, the choice rests with Saoirse, who elects to remain behind with her father and brother, even though it means giving up her selkie powers and becoming fully human, if Bronagh takes Saoirse's coat to untangle their worlds. Accepting her daughter's decision, Bronagh takes her coat. Conor tells Bronagh that he loves her so much, and they kiss. Ben asks Bronagh to stay as well, but she is unable to and tells him to remember her in his stories and songs and that she'll always love him, before kissing her son's forehead. After a tearful farewell, Ben and his family happily return home to their island, where Granny finally arrives, and Conor tells her he's now well enough to take care of the children.

In a mid-credits scene, the family is shown happily painting a mural of their home, Bronagh, and the Faeries and celebrating Ben's birthday, and Ben and Saoirse, now closer than ever, go swimming with Cú and the seals in the ocean.

Voice cast

English 

 David Rawle as Ben
 Brendan Gleeson as Conor and the Mac Lir
 Fionnula Flanagan as Granny and Macha
 Lisa Hannigan as Bronagh; Ben and Saoirse's mother
 Lucy O'Connell as Saoirse
 Jon Kenny as Ferry Dan and The Great Seanachaí
 Pat Shortt as Lug
 Colm Ó Snodaigh as Mossy
 Liam Hourican as Spud and Bus Driver
 Kevin Swierszcz as Young Ben
 Will Collins as Additional voices
 Paul Young as Additional voices

Irish 
 James Ó Floinn as Ben
 Brendan Gleeson as Conor and the Mac Lir
Fionnula Flanagan as Granny and Macha
Gráinne Bleasdale as Bronagh
Fionán Farley Nolan as Saoirse
Maurice O'Donoghue as the Great Seanchaí
Donncha Crowley as Lug
Niall McDonagh as Mossy, Ferry Dan, and Rock Shee
Tomás Ó Súilleabháin as Spud and Bus Driver
Ríona Farley Nolan as Young Ben

Scottish Gaelic 
 Kathleen NicAonghais as Ben
 Dàibhidh Walker as Conor, Mac Lir and Rock Shee
 Donna Nic 'Ille Mhoire as Macha
 Catherine Tinney as Saoirse and Young Ben
 Màiri Nic 'Ille Mhoire as Bronagh
 Ailig Dòmhnallach as Ferry Dan and Lug
 Anna Mhoireach as Granny
 Iain MacFhionghain as Mossy and Bus Driver
 Iain MacRath as Spud and the Great Seanchaí

French 
 Jean-Stan DuPac as Ben
 Patrick Béthune as Connor 
 Nolwenn Leroy as Bruna
 Nathalie Homs as Granny and Macha
 Cyrille Artaux as Lug
 Pascal Sellem as Spud
 Thisbée Vidal-Lefebvre as Young Ben
 Marc Perez as Mossy

Music

The original music for the film was composed by Bruno Coulais, in collaboration with the Irish group Kíla. "The Derry Tune" originally featured on Kíla's 2010 album Soisín. The film also features the voice of Lisa Hannigan and songs by Nolwenn Leroy. A soundtrack album, consisting of 25 songs from the film, was released digitally on 9 December 2014 by Decca Records.

 Track listing

Release
Song of the Sea premiered at the 2014 Toronto International Film Festival on 6 September 2014 in the TIFF Kids program. Theatrically, it was released in France, Belgium and Luxembourg on 10 December 2014. It received a limited release in North America on 19 December 2014, which qualified it for an Academy Award nomination. It was released in Ireland on 10 July 2015.

Reception

Box office

Critical response
Early reviews were universally positive. Todd Brown, founder and editor of Twitch Film, gave a highly positive review of the film, saying that "a tale that weds absolutely gorgeous artwork with beautifully nuanced characters and a deep but natural rooting in ancient folk tales and magic, Song of the Sea has an assured and timeless quality to it. It is the sort of story that feels as though it always existed somewhere, just waiting until now to be told". "Song of the Sea is not about selling units, it's about story and heart and emotion and wonder and craftsmanship and because of that it becomes timeless, a beautiful piece of art that will delight audiences old and young and confirms what many suspected of Moore after Kells: The man's a master storyteller, and we can only hope he has many, many more stories to tell."

On review aggregation website Rotten Tomatoes, the film has a Certified Fresh approval rating of 99% based on 97 reviews, with an average rating of 8.40/10. The site's critics' consensus reads: "Song of the Sea boasts narrative depth commensurate with its visual beauty, adding up to an animated saga overflowing with family-friendly riches." On Metacritic the film has a score of 85 out of 100, from 24 reviews indicating "universal acclaim".

Writing in the Toronto Review, Carlos Aguilar said of the film: "Watching Song of the Sea it is easy to assert that this is one of the most blissfully beautiful animated films ever made. It is a gem beaming with awe-inspiring, heartwarming magic".

Sara Stewart from the New York Post said "If you want some real cinematic magic this holiday season, don’t miss this enchanting Irish film about a pair of siblings and a piece of Celtic folklore that turns out to be true".

Animator Ken Priebe compared the film to the works of Hayao Miyazaki, such as Spirited Away.

Accolades

Home media
Song of the Sea was released on DVD and Blu-Ray in Region 1 by Universal Studios Home Entertainment on 17 March 2015.

It was later included in the Irish Folklore Trilogy Blu-Ray box set in the US and UK/Ireland along with The Secret of Kells and Wolfwalkers. GKIDS and Shout! Factory released the Region A box set in North America on December 14, 2021, while StudioCanal released the Region B box set in the UK and Ireland on December 20.

See also
 List of animated feature-length films
 Cartoon Saloon

References

External links
 
 
 
 

2014 films
2014 animated films
Animated adventure films
European Film Awards winners (films)
Belgian animated films
Danish animated films
French animated films
Films set in the 1980s
Irish animated films
Irish animated fantasy films
Luxembourgian animated films
English-language Irish films
English-language Belgian films
English-language Danish films
English-language French films
English-language Luxembourgian films
Irish-language films
2010s children's fantasy films
French animated feature films
Films about Halloween
Films about siblings
Films set in Ireland
Irish independent films
Magic realism films
Films about mermaids
Films about fairies and sprites
Belgian independent films
French independent films
Animated films based on Celtic mythology
Films directed by Tomm Moore
Anime-influenced Western animation
2010s children's animated films
StudioCanal films
StudioCanal animated films
Cartoon Saloon films
Irish Film Board films
Films scored by Bruno Coulais
Saint Patrick's Day fiction
2010s English-language films
Irish children's films
2010s French animated films